Moho may refer to:

Birds
 Moho (genus), an extinct genus of birds in the family Mohoidae
 The Hawaiian name of the Hawaiian rail, an extinct species
 The Māori name of the North Island takahe, an extinct species
 A local name for the oriole warbler, Hypergerus atriceps

Computers
 Moho (software), 2D animation software also sold as Anime Studio
 Moho Engine, used in games such as Supreme Commander
 Moho (video game), a 2000 Dreamcast game by Take-Two Interactive

Geology and geography
 Moho discontinuity, the boundary between the Earth's crust and the mantle
 Moho, Puno, a city in Peru
 Moho District, Peru
 Moho Province, Peru
 Moho River, in Guatemala and Belize

Other uses
 Model of Human Occupation, a model of practice in occupational therapy
 Mount Holyoke College, a small, historically-women's liberal arts college in South Hadley, MA, USA
Motorhome, a type of vehicle used for recreational travel.